Marcelo Magalhães Serrado (born 10 February 1967 in Rio de Janeiro) is a Brazilian actor.

Biography 

Marcelo began his career at CAL (Casa de Arte das Laranjeiras) in 1985.

He made his television debut in 1987 in the telenovela Corpo Santo of TV Manchete.

In 1989, Serrado moved to Rede Globo where he was cast in Pacto de Sangue.

In 2005, after 15 years working in several Rede Globo productions, Serrado decided not to renew his contract with the station to work on Mandrake, a series produced by cable channel HBO Brazil. After three years in the Rede Record, he starred in the novels Prova de Amor and Vidas Opostas.

In 2008, Serrado hosted the musical reality show Tom & Vinícius, o musical. Serrado, the creator of the show, wanted to show the young duo meeting in 1955 to assemble the play Orfeu da Conceição up since 1965 with international fame. The cast played Tom Jobim as Thelmo Fernandes and Vinicius de Moraes.

Serrado in 2009, joined the cast of  Poder Paralelo of Rede Record.

In 2010, the actor was famous for the monologue Não Existe Mulher Difícil. The following year, Serrado appeared on the big screen in the feature film Malu de Bicicleta.

He returned to Rede Globo in 2011 where he played Crô, a homosexual, with Butler as the villain's sidekick played by Tereza Cristina (Christiane Torloni) in the primetime telenovela Fina Estampa.

In 2012, he was cast in the telenovela Gabriela. In November of the same year, it was announced by columnist Regina Rito, the newspaper O Dia, that Serrado will play the character Crô of Fina Estampa again, but now in a feature film. The script of Super Crô - O Filme was then being written by Aguinaldo Silva together with Rodrigo Ribeiro and Maurício Gyboski. It was directed by Bruno Barreto.

Personal life 

He was married to actress Christine Fernandes from 1994 to 1999. The actor has a daughter named Catarina, from his ex-wife, actress Rafaela Mandelli. On 4 August 2012, Serrado married the ballerina Roberta Fernandes, on 9 April 2013, the couple welcomed twins, named Felipe and Guilherme. For panic syndrome Marcelo Serrado is being treated with medications and Transcendental Meditation.

Filmography

Television

Film

References

External links 
 

1967 births
Living people
Male actors from Rio de Janeiro (city)
Brazilian male television actors
Brazilian male telenovela actors
Brazilian male film actors
Brazilian male stage actors